Seaton will be a community in north Pickering in Ontario, Canada. Seaton is bounded by West Duffins Creek to the west, Sideline 16 to the east, Highway 7 to the north, and the CP Rail line to the south; it abuts the  communities of Green River, Whitevale, and Brougham. It has been devised by the provincial government since the 1970s.  By the time of full build-out, the community is expected to include a population of up to 70,000 people and 35,000 jobs.

Politics
In the early 1970s, the provincial government expropriated and purchased approximately 8,100 hectares of land in north Pickering.  These lands, known as the North Pickering Land Assembly, were acquired to develop a community of approximately 250,000.  This community would serve the proposed federal international airport, which was to be located just to the north. To date, not only has an airport not been constructed, but there is no official decision regarding whether it is required.

The Seaton lands (originally known as Cedarwood), have received much attention from local residents and environmentalists. It was a prominent component of the North Pickering Land Exchange of November 2003 enacted by the Liberal provincial government, in which developers received land in Seaton in exchange for lands owned by those developers on the Oak Ridges Moraine, primarily in Richmond Hill and Uxbridge. Development of the area began near Taunton Road in 2017, as well as at Whites Road and Highway7 as of 2023.

Communities
Similar to Cornell in the adjacent City of Markham, Seaton will have planned communities built within it. Pickering has named these as:

 Lamoreaux - likely named for Huguenot Loyalist Josue L'Amoreaux (1738–1834)
 Brock-Taunton
 Mount Pleasant
 Wilson Meadows
 Thompson's Corners
 Pickering Innovation Corridor

References

External links
Seaton community page at City of Pickering website
Seaton Placemaking guidelines
Map of Seaton and Duffins Rouge Agricultural Preserve within Pickering
Friends of Seaton Trail

Neighbourhoods in Pickering, Ontario